Reinhard Blechert (born 7 June 1947) is a German former swimmer. He competed in three events at the 1968 Summer Olympics.

References

External links
 

1947 births
Living people
German male swimmers
Olympic swimmers of West Germany
Swimmers at the 1968 Summer Olympics
People from Böhlen
Sportspeople from Saxony